Hume’s Pass is a low pass on the Great Dividing Range in central Victoria, Australia. It is located at Wandong in the Shire of Mitchell local government area,  from the state capital, Melbourne.

The traditional owners of Hume’s Pass are the Taungurung people, a part of the Kulin nation that inhabited a large portion of central Victoria including Port Phillip Bay and its surrounds.

History
Hume’s Pass was discovered and named by Hamilton Hume and Captain William Hilton Hovell on the 13th December, 1824 during the first European journey through inland Victoria. It enabled them to break through over the top of the Great Dividing Range. Hovell described its location clearly in his journal of that day.

However a map produced by Hume had an error in it leading to uncertainty about its true location for 197 years.

The route recorded by Hume and Hovell from the nearby town of Broadford to Hume’s Pass, was shown approximately in an 1857 map from the Surveyor General’s Department of Victoria.

The approximate route was shown again in 1924 during major celebrations for the centenary of the Hume and Hovell journey.

Finally an old settler’s trail across the exact location of Hume’s Pass was shown in 1930 on the Victorian Army Survey map of that year without it being acknowledged.

The independent Royal Historical Society of Victoria demonstrated in its double-blind refereed journal in 2021 how to correct the error in the Hume map and thus revealed the true location to be 1260 metres south of Arkell’s Lane Wandong.

Hume’s Pass still has not been officially named after two centuries, unlike other places first named by Hume and Hovell.

References 

Towns in Victoria (Australia)